The Sheldon House is a historic house located in Cranston, Rhode Island. The house was listed on the National Register of Historic Places on January 5, 1989.

Description and history 
The oldest portion of the -story, gambrel-roofed Cape-style house was originally built around 1728. It was probably enlarged in 1764, when it was inherited by Nicholas Sheldon III; the northern half of the house exhibits more sophisticated Georgian detailing than the southern half. The Sheldons were major landowners in Cranston, and built a number of surviving 18th-century houses in the area; this one is the oldest of those.

See also
National Register of Historic Places listings in Providence County, Rhode Island

References

Houses on the National Register of Historic Places in Rhode Island
Houses completed in 1728
Houses in Cranston, Rhode Island
National Register of Historic Places in Providence County, Rhode Island
1728 establishments in the Thirteen Colonies
Colonial architecture in Rhode Island